Greenwood Cemetery is a cemetery in Boonton, in the U.S. state of New Jersey.

Notable interments
 John H. Capstick (1856–1918), represented New Jersey's 5th congressional district from 1918 to 1919.
 Charles Ferren Hopkins (1842–1934), Medal of Honor recipient while fighting for the 1st New Jersey Volunteer Infantry during the American Civil War.
 Joshua S. Salmon (1846–1902), represented New Jersey's 4th congressional district from 1902 to 1903.
 Arthur Stringer (1874–1950), writer and poet

References

External links
 Greenwood Cemetery at The Political Graveyard
 

Boonton, New Jersey
Cemeteries in Morris County, New Jersey